Möhring is a German surname. Notable people with the surname include:

 Anke Möhring (born 1969), East German swimmer
 Charlotte Möhring (1887 - 1970), German aviator
 Cornelia Möhring (born 1960), German politician
 Günther Möhring (1936-2006), German chess player
 Herbert Mohring (1928–2012), University of Minnesota transportation economist
 Mike Mohring (born 1971), German politician (CDU)
 Mike Mohring (born 1974), American football player
 Paul Möhring (1710 - 1792), German physician, botanist and zoologist

See also 
 Mehr (name)
 Mehring (disambiguation)
 Mohr; Möhrle (Möhrke), Mohren, Mohrmann

German-language surnames